Albulae is an ancient city and former bishopric in Roman Africa. It remains a titular see of the Roman Catholic Church. It is identified with the modern town of Ain Temouchent, in present Algeria, near the Moroccan border.

History 
Albulae was initially important enough in the Roman province of Mauretania Caesariensis to become one of the suffragans of the Metropolitan Archbishopric for its capital, Caesarea Mauretaniae. However, its influence gradually waned.

Titular bishopric 
The diocese was nominally restored in 1933 as a Latin titular bishopric.

Titular bishops of Albulae, of the lowest (episcopal) rank, with an archiepiscopal exception, have been : 
 Percival Caza (1948.08.11 – 1966.09.22), later Bishop of Valleyfield, Quebec
 Titular archbishop Edward Daniel Howard (1966.12.09 – 1983.01.02), as emeritate; previously Titular Bishop of Isauropolis (1923.12.23 – 1926.04.30), Auxiliary Bishop of Davenport (USA) (1923.12.23 – 1926.04.30), Metropolitan Archbishop of Oregon City (1926.04.30 – 1928.09.26), 
Metropolitan Archbishop of Portland in Oregon (USA) (1928.09.26 – 1966.12.09)
 Vicente Credo Manuel, Divine Word Missionaries (S.V.D.) (1983.03.17 – 2007.08.18)
 João Carlos Seneme, Stigmatines (C.S.S.) (2007.10.17 – 2013.06.26), later Bishop of Toledo, Parana, Brazil
 Marco Eugênio Galrão Leite de Almeida (2013.09.25 - ... ), Auxiliary Bishop of São Salvador da Bahia (Brazil)

References

Sources and external links
 GCatholic with titular incumbent bio links 

Catholic titular sees in Africa
Roman sites in Algeria